Levi Heywood Greenwood
(December 22, 1872 – April 7, 1930) was a businessman and Republican politician from Massachusetts in the late 19th and early 20th century.  He was the father of former Fitchburg Mayor Robert E. Greenwood.

Early years
Greenwood was born in Gardner, Massachusetts, to Alvni M. and Helen R. Greenwood, on December 22, 1872.

Marriage
Greenwood married Mary Alberta Cann of Brooklyn, New York on February 11, 1895.  They had four children, Eleanor Greenwood (Hornblower), Margaret Greenwood, Richard Neal Greenwood and Robert E. Greenwood.

Political career
Greenwood was President of the Massachusetts State Senate in 1912 and 1913.

1913 election
In 1913 election, Greenwood had initially decided not to run for re-election the Senate but to run for lieutenant governor. He then changed his mind. His opposition to giving women the right to vote caused him to be a focus of opposition by the suffragist movement, and suffragists threw their support to Edward Sibley, Greenwood's opponent, which helped Sibley win.

Businesses

Publisher
Greenwood was the Publisher and President of The Gardner News of Gardner, Massachusetts.

Furniture manufacturer
In 1912, Greenwood was one of the directors of Heywood Brothers and Wakefield Co, manufacturers of Rattan & Reed Furniture in Gardner. By 1921 Greenwood was one of the owners By 1926 he was the President of the

Directorships
Greenwood was also a corporate director of several banks (The First National Bank of Boston, The First National Bank of Gardner) and street railways (The Paducah Light and Traction Company, The Galveston-Houston Electric Company, and the Columbus Electric Company).

See also
 131st Massachusetts General Court (1910)
 134th Massachusetts General Court (1913)

References

Bibliography
 Coolidge, Henry D.: A Manual for the Use of the General Court for 1921 (1921), p. 259.
''Who's Who in State Politics, 1912, Boston, MA: Practical Politics, (1912), pp. 52–53.

Footnotes

1872 births
1930 deaths
American bankers
American corporate directors
American energy industry executives
American newspaper publishers (people)
American railway entrepreneurs
20th-century American railroad executives
Businesspeople from Massachusetts
Harvard College alumni
Republican Party Massachusetts state senators
Republican Party members of the Massachusetts House of Representatives
People from Gardner, Massachusetts
St. Paul's School (New Hampshire) alumni